was a Japanese actor best known for the protagonist of Sōgo Ishii's 1980 film Crazy Thunder Road.

Filmography
 Crazy Thunder Road (1980)
 Yokohama BJ Blues (1981)
 Welter (1987)
 Evil Dead Trap 3: Broken Love Killer (1993)
 Shinjuku Outlaw (1994)
 Another Lonely Hitman (1995)
 Berlin (1995)
 Whiteout (2000)
 Chloe (2001)
 Sabu (2002)
 When the Last Sword Is Drawn (2003)
 Tokyo Noir (2004)
 Scrap Heaven (2005)
 The Battery (2007)
 Be a Man! Samurai School (2008)
 Departures (2008)

References

External links
 
 

Japanese male actors
1956 births
2009 deaths
People from Toyama (city)